The 1992 Nobel Prize in Literature was awarded to the Saint Lucian poet Derek Walcott (1930–2017) "for a poetic oeuvre of great luminosity, sustained by a historical vision, the outcome of a multicultural commitment." He became the first and only Caribbean writer to be awarded with the prize.

Laureate

Derek Walcott's works often deal with Caribbean history, while he simultaneous searches for vestiges of the colonial era. Western literary canon is revised and given a completely new form, as in the poetry collection Omeros (1990). His poetic voice reflected a blend of his ear for the English language and his sense of his own people. In his writing, Walcott explores the complexity of living and working in two cultures. Aside from poetry, Walcott also wrote plays which brought him theatre recognitions such as Henri Christophe: A Chronicle in Seven Scenes (1950), Dream on Monkey Mountain (1967), and Beef, No Chicken (1987).

Reactions
Stephen Breslow explained that he and the Swedish Academy chose Derek Walcott for the Nobel Laureate in Literature because his work had "a strong regional voice that transcends its topical locality, through the depth and breadth of its poetic resonance and through its global human implication." It was Walcott's ability to be more than just "exotic" that brought his work critical attention. Breslow explains that "Walcott has merged a profound, rhapsodic reverie upon his remote birthplace – its people, its landscape, and its history – with the central, classical tradition of Western civilization." This ability shows the importance of multiculturalism and literary mastery to the Swedish Academy. Walcott's works represent how different cultures can enrich one another to produce even more compelling works.

Nobel lecture
In his Nobel acceptance speech, Walcott describes life on Antilles and what it means to discover identity. He describes all of the "broken fragments" of his "diasporic" identity. People need books, he says, but they are not enough to encompass all that a culture is. Walcott says that "the visible poetry of the Antilles, then. [is] Survival" because "all of the Antilles, every island, is an effort of memory; every mind, every racial biography culminating in amnesia and fog." He encompasses the diasporic identity found in Caribbean literature by looking at how insignificant he feels because he cannot, alone, fully bring together a cultural identity.

References

External links
1992 Press release nobelprize.org
Award ceremony speech nobelprize.org

1992